Barh railway station (station code BARH) is a railway station in the Danapur railway division of East Central Railway. Barh is connected to metropolitan areas of India, by the Delhi–Kolkata main line via Mugalsarai–Patna route. Barh station is serving the town of Barh in Patna district in the Indian state of Bihar. Due to its location on the Howrah–Patna–Mughalsarai main line many Patna, Barauni, bound express trains coming from Howrah, Sealdah, stop here.

History
Barh is one of the oldest railway stations on Howrah–Patna–Delhi route. This is a very important station as it is also connected to NTPC Barh, where coal is supplied from Jharkhand via .

Facilities 
The major facilities available are waiting rooms, computerized reservation facility, and vehicle parking. Vehicles are allowed to enter the station premises. The station also has STD/ISD/PCO telephone booth, toilets, tea stall and book stall.

Platforms
The four platforms are interconnected with foot overbridges.

Development
The Indian Railways had planned to set up a Railway Station Development Corporation that will work on improving the major railway stations as Barh railway station by building and developing restaurants, shopping areas and food plazas for commercial business and improving passenger amenities. Railway planned to make station as A grade category. After determining the railway stations that need to be good-class station by constructing well. A phased revamping has begun.
Deputy chief traffic manager announced that the pending work at the railway tracks and platforms, presently under construction, will be sped up.

Nearest airports
The nearest airports to Barh Station are:
 Lok Nayak Jayaprakash Airport, Patna 
 Gaya Airport

See also 
 Barh Super Thermal Power Station

References

External links 
 Barh station map at India Rail Info
 Official website of the Patna district

Railway stations in Patna district
Danapur railway division